, often called , is a Japanese private railway company in Kobe and surrounding cities. It is a subsidiary of Hankyu Hanshin Toho Group.

Lines
Arima Line (Minatogawa - Arima Onsen)
Sanda Line (Arimaguchi - Sanda)
Kōen-Toshi Line (Yokoyama - Woody Town Chuo)
Ao Line (Suzurandai - Ao)
Kobe Kosoku Line (Shinkaichi - Minatogawa) - Kobe Rapid Transit Railway owns the tracks of the line as the "Namboku Line". Shintetsu operates trains on the line.

Rolling stock
 1000 series
 1100 series
 1300 series
 1500 series
 2000 series
 3000 series
 5000 series
 6000 series
 6500 series (from spring 2016)

References

External links

  

Transport in Kobe
Railway companies of Japan
Companies based in Kobe
Hankyu Hanshin Holdings
Companies listed on the Tokyo Stock Exchange
1926 establishments in Japan